Jun Min-kyung (born 16 January 1985) is a South Korean women's football goalkeeper, who plays for Daekyo Kangaroos WFC in South Korean WK-League and the South Korea women's national football team.

References

External links
KFA Profile 
Jun Min-kyung at Asian Games Incheon 2014

1985 births
Living people
South Korean women's footballers
South Korea women's international footballers
WK League players
Asian Games medalists in football
Footballers at the 2006 Asian Games
Footballers at the 2010 Asian Games
Footballers at the 2014 Asian Games
2015 FIFA Women's World Cup players
Women's association football goalkeepers
Asian Games bronze medalists for South Korea
Medalists at the 2010 Asian Games
Medalists at the 2014 Asian Games